Wilhelmina Ruth Delco (born July 16, 1929) is an American politician who served in the Texas House of Representatives. She was inducted into the Texas Women's Hall of Fame in 1986.

Early life 
On July 16, 1929, Delco was born as Wilhelmina Ruth Fitzgerald in Chicago, Illinois. Delco's parents were Juanita and William P. Fitzgerald.
Delco attended Wendell Phillips Academy High School.

Education 
In 1950, Delco earned a BA in sociology at Fisk University.

Career 
In 1968, Delco was elected to the board of trustees for the Austin Independent School District, becoming the first African American elected to public office in Austin.

Delco was elected to the House of Representatives for Travis County in 1974 and served ten terms in the legislature. From 1979 to 1991, she was chair of the Higher Education Committee for the House. From 1991 to 1993, she was speaker "pro tempore" for the House of Representatives. She retired from the legislature in 1995.

She has been chair of the board of trustees for Huston-Tillotson College and adjunct professor at the University of Texas at Austin with the Community College Leadership Program. She has been chair of the National Advisory Committee on Institutional Quality and Integrity of the United States Department of Education.

In 1993, she received the James Bryant Conant Award.

Personal life 
Delco's husband is Exalton A. Delco, Jr. In 1952, Delco and her husband moved to Austin, Texas.

References

External links 
 Interview with State Representative Wilhelmina Delco, 1984-11-21, In Black America, KUT Radio, American Archive of Public Broadcasting (WGBH and the Library of Congress)

1929 births
Living people
Fisk University alumni
Democratic Party members of the Texas House of Representatives